Calliostoma imperiale is a species of sea snail, a marine gastropod mollusk in the family Calliostomatidae.

Description

Distribution
This species occurs in the Pacific Ocean off the Midway Islands.

References

 Kosuge S. (1979) Description of a new species of the genus Calliostoma from the Central Pacific (Trochidae, Gastropoda). Bulletin of the Institute of Malacology, Tokyo 1(2): 19, pl. 4.

External links

imperiale
Gastropods described in 1979